Joaquín Oscar Larrivey (born 20 August 1984) is an Argentine professional footballer who plays as a centre forward who plays as a for  club Südtirol.

He is nicknamed el Bati, for his physical resemblance to former footballer Gabriel Batistuta. Larrivey also holds a European Union passport as a second nationality.

Biography
Larrivey began his career in Argentina with Huracán and quickly became an important player for the side. Larrivey was signed by Italian Serie A side Cagliari in June 2007 on a 4-year contract. On 12 February 2009 Vélez Sársfield of Argentine Primera División signed him on loan until the end of the season. He started successfully at Vélez scoring in his debut game against Tigre. He also scored against Godoy Cruz and Rosario Central. However, after this last one (which was in the 7th game of the Clausura tournament) he was held scoreless. On 1 July 2009, Larrivey returned to Cagliari. On 5 August 2010, he was loaned to Club Atlético Colón.

In 2011, Joaquin Larrivey returned to Cagliari again, this time to take a first team place. After the departure of Alessandro Matri who was sold to Juventus F.C. and Robert Acquafresca who returned to Genoa after his 1-year loan, Larrivey and Nenê became the first choice strikers. He was assigned the number 9 shirt before the beginning of the season. On 21 August 2011, Larrivey scored a hat-trick in a 5–1 win over U.C. AlbinoLeffe in the Coppa Italia, becoming only the second player to do so in the history of Cagliari, together with legend "Gigi" Riva. On 28 November 2012 Larrivey left Cagliari .

On 17 December 2012 Larrivey was presented as a new player for Mexican club Atlante. He was signed to form the attack with Chilean Esteban Paredes. On 27 January 2013 he scored his first goals with the club recording a brace against Chiapas in a 4–3 victory.

On 3 February 2022, Larrivey joined Serie B side Cosenza on a deal until the end of the season. On 31 January 2023, Larrivey's contract with Cosenza was terminated by mutual consent.

On 2 February 2023, Larrivey signed with Südtirol, also in Serie B.

Personal life
He is the son-in-law of Gerardo Reinoso, an Argentine former professional football player.

Honours
Vélez Sársfield
Primera División Argentina: Clausura 2009

References

External links
 

 Statistics at Irish Times
 Football.it Profile 
 Argentine Primera statistics at Fútbol XXI  
 Cagliari player profile 
 Joaquin Larrivey tribute site 

1984 births
Living people
Sportspeople from Entre Ríos Province
Association football forwards
Argentine footballers
Argentine expatriate footballers
Argentine expatriate sportspeople in Spain
Club Atlético Huracán footballers
Cagliari Calcio players
Club Atlético Vélez Sarsfield footballers
Club Atlético Colón footballers
Atlante F.C. footballers
Rayo Vallecano players
RC Celta de Vigo players
Baniyas Club players
JEF United Chiba players
Cerro Porteño players
Universidad de Chile footballers
Cosenza Calcio players
F.C. Südtirol players
J2 League players
Argentine Primera División players
Serie A players
Liga MX players
La Liga players
UAE Pro League players
Paraguayan Primera División players
Chilean Primera División players
Serie B players
Expatriate footballers in Italy
Expatriate footballers in Mexico
Expatriate footballers in Spain
Expatriate footballers in the United Arab Emirates
Expatriate footballers in Paraguay
Expatriate footballers in Chile
Argentine expatriate sportspeople in Italy
Argentine expatriate sportspeople in Mexico
Argentine expatriate sportspeople in the United Arab Emirates
Argentine expatriate sportspeople in Paraguay
Argentine expatriate sportspeople in Chile